Høle or Høgsfjord is a former municipality in Rogaland county, Norway.  The large municipality existed from 1865 until 1965.  It was called Høgsfjord from 1865 until 1871 when the municipality was reduced in size and the name was changed to Høle.  The municipality originally was quite large, surrounding both sides of the Høgsfjorden and Lysefjorden. Throughout its history, it included large parts of the present-day municipalities of Sandnes and Gjesdal.  Since 1965, the area of Høle has been the borough of Høle in Sandnes municipality. Høle Church was the main church of the municipality.

History
The municipality of Høgsfjord was established in 1865 when it was separated from the large municipality of Strand. Initially, there were 3,203 residents.  On 1 January 1871 the district Fossan located east of the Høgsfjorden (population: 2,081) was split off from Høgsfjord to form a municipality of its own. The remaining part of Høgsfjord changed its name to Høle, and had a population of 1,122.

On 1 January 1965, there were many municipal mergers in Norway due to the recommendations of the Schei Committee.  On that date, the municipality of Høle was dissolved.  The southeastern corner of Høle surrounding the farming village of Oltesvik (population: 37) was transferred to the municipality of Gjesdal.  The rest of Høle, with 926 inhabitants, was incorporated into the neighboring municipality of Sandnes.

Government
All municipalities in Norway, including Høle, are responsible for primary education (through 10th grade), outpatient health services, senior citizen services, unemployment and other social services, zoning, economic development, and municipal roads.  The municipality is governed by a municipal council of elected representatives, which in turn elects a mayor.

Municipal council
The municipal council  of Høle was made up of 13 representatives that were elected to four year terms.  The party breakdown of the final municipal council was as follows:

See also
List of former municipalities of Norway

References

Sandnes
Gjesdal
Former municipalities of Norway
1865 establishments in Norway
1965 disestablishments in Norway